Mark Osborne (born August 13, 1961) is a Canadian former ice hockey player. Osborne played in 919 games, tallying 212 goals and 531 points.

Playing career
As a youth, Osborne played in the 1974 Quebec International Pee-Wee Hockey Tournament with the Toronto Shopsy's minor ice hockey team. Having walked onto the team, Osborne played his entire junior career for the Niagara Falls Flyers of the Ontario Hockey League (OHL) consisting of three seasons, between 1979 and 1981. After his second year there, he was selected 46th overall by the Detroit Red Wings in the 1980 NHL Entry Draft.

During the 1983 off-season he was traded to the New York Rangers in the trade that saw popular Ron Duguay leave the Rangers. He played a significant role on the Rangers, placed on a line with Anders Hedberg and Mark Pavelich. At the  trade deadline he was shipped to the Maple Leafs for his first stint there, which lasted five and a half seasons. In Toronto he played on a line with Gary Leeman and Ed Olczyk called the "GEM"" line. In November 1990, he was sent to the Winnipeg Jets in a large trade including linemate Olcyzk, but returned to the Leafs in a  trade deadline deal for Lucien Deblois. In his second stint with Toronto he was on an effective checking line with Bill Berg and Peter Zezel and helped the Leafs reach the Conference Finals in two consecutive playoff years ( and ), falling short each time of making it to the Stanley Cup Finals. Before the lockout shortened  Osborne signed with the Rangers, for his final NHL season. He went on to play three more years with the Cleveland Lumberjacks of the International Hockey League (IHL) as a player-coach, retiring in 1997.

Post playing career
After retiring Osborne worked as coach of the Toronto St. Michael's Majors of the OHL from October 29, 1999, to August 2000, after serving as an assistant coach the previous season. He followed that by becoming assistant GM of the Mississauga IceDogs for the 2002–03 season. Osborne was a hockey analyst with The Score Television Network. He then became an analyst for Leafs TV, a popular media outlet covering the Toronto Maple Leafs. He is currently a pro scout for the Los Angeles Kings organization.

Personal life
Osborne is a devout Christian and worked at Christian hockey camps. His nickname is Ozzie. He has been married to actress Madolyn Smith since 1988; they have two daughters together. His father, Alex Osborne, formerly led a major branch of the CIBC in Toronto.

Career statistics

References

External links
 
Page at Hockeydraftcentral.com

1961 births
Living people
Adirondack Red Wings players
Canadian Christians
Cleveland Lumberjacks players
Detroit Red Wings draft picks
Detroit Red Wings players
Niagara Falls Flyers players
New York Rangers players
Sportspeople from Etobicoke
Ice hockey people from Toronto
Toronto Maple Leafs players
Winnipeg Jets (1979–1996) players
Canadian ice hockey left wingers